The meridian 88° east of Greenwich is a line of longitude that extends from the North Pole across the Arctic Ocean, Asia, the Indian Ocean, the Southern Ocean, and Antarctica to the South Pole.

The 88th meridian east forms a great circle with the 92nd meridian west.

From Pole to Pole
Starting at the North Pole and heading south to the South Pole, the 88th meridian east passes through:

{| class="wikitable plainrowheaders"
! scope="col" width="120" | Co-ordinates
! scope="col" | Country, territory or sea
! scope="col" | Notes
|-
| style="background:#b0e0e6;" | 
! scope="row" style="background:#b0e0e6;" | Arctic Ocean
| style="background:#b0e0e6;" |
|-
| style="background:#b0e0e6;" | 
! scope="row" style="background:#b0e0e6;" | Kara Sea
| style="background:#b0e0e6;" |
|-
| 
! scope="row" | 
| Krasnoyarsk Krai — Ringnes Island
|-
| style="background:#b0e0e6;" | 
! scope="row" style="background:#b0e0e6;" | Kara Sea
| style="background:#b0e0e6;" |
|-valign="top"
| 
! scope="row" | 
| Krasnoyarsk Krai Tomsk Oblast — from  Kemerovo Oblast — from  Altai Republic — from  Republic of Khakassia — from  Altai Republic — from  Republic of Khakassia — from  Altai Republic — from 
|-
| 
! scope="row" | 
|
|-
| 
! scope="row" | 
| Xinjiang - for about 15 km
|-
| 
! scope="row" | 
| For about 6 km
|-valign="top"
| 
! scope="row" | 
| Xinjiang Tibet — from 
|-
| 
! scope="row" | 
|
|-
| 
! scope="row" | 
| West Bengal - for about 6 km
|-
| 
! scope="row" | 
|
|-valign="top"
| 
! scope="row" | 
| Bihar West Bengal — from  Bihar — from  West Bengal — from 
|-
| style="background:#b0e0e6;" | 
! scope="row" style="background:#b0e0e6;" | Indian Ocean
| style="background:#b0e0e6;" |
|-
| style="background:#b0e0e6;" | 
! scope="row" style="background:#b0e0e6;" | Southern Ocean
| style="background:#b0e0e6;" |
|-
| 
! scope="row" | Antarctica
| Australian Antarctic Territory, claimed by 
|-
|}

e088 meridian east